Powdersmoke Range is a 1935 black-and-white Western film directed by Wallace Fox starring Harry Carey, Hoot Gibson, Guinn Williams and Bob Steele. It is based on the 1934 novel of the same name by William Colt MacDonald with characters who would later appear in Republic's The Three Mesquiteers film series.

Plot summary

Cast
 Harry Carey as Tucson Smith
 Hoot Gibson as Stony Brooke
 Bob Steele as Jeff Ferguson aka Guadalupe Kid
 Tom Tyler as Sundown Saunders
 Guinn "Big Boy" Williams as Lullaby Joslin 
 Boots Mallory as Carolyn Sibley 
 Ray Mayer as Chan Bell
 Sam Hardy as Big Steve Ogden
 Adrian Morris as Deputy Brose Glascow
 Buzz Barton as Buck
 Hal Taliaferro as Aloysius 'Bud' Taggart (as Wally Wales)
 Art Mix as Rube Phelps
 Jay Wilsey as Tex Malcolm (as Buffalo Bill Jr.)
 Buddy Roosevelt as Henchman Barnett

See also
 Harry Carey filmography
 Hoot Gibson filmography
 Bob Steele filmography

References

External links
 
 
 
 

1935 films
1935 Western (genre) films
American Western (genre) films
American black-and-white films
RKO Pictures films
Films based on American novels
Films based on Western (genre) novels
Films produced by Cliff Reid
Films directed by Wallace Fox
1930s American films